Alken is a municipality in the district of Mayen-Koblenz in Rhineland-Palatinate, western Germany.

Above the village on a hill spur stand the ruins of Thurant Castle.

References

Mayen-Koblenz